Kifteh Giveh Sin (also Romanized as Kīfteh Gīveh Sīn; also known as Kīfteh Gīv Sīn) is a village in Padena-ye Vosta Rural District, Padena District, Semirom County, Isfahan Province, Iran. At the 2006 census, its population was 1,396, in 281 families.

References 

Populated places in Semirom County